Marketos may refer to:

Peoples

Jake Marketo (1989-), Australian rugby league footballer
Michael Marketo (1959-), Australian rugby league footballer

See also
Marketo, former software company, now part of Adobe
Spyros Marketos (1931-2012), Greek physician and professor